Richard Michalczyk (born 5 November 1950) is a former Australian rules footballer who played with North Melbourne in the Victorian Football League (VFL) and East Perth in the Western Australian National Football League (WANFL).

Football career

WANFL
Michalczyk, who was originally from Narembeen, debuted at East Perth halfway through the 1969 WANFL season.

He was a member of East Perth's 1972 premiership team. After a dominant performance at centre half-back in the second semi-final, Michalczyk was one of East Perth's best in their 15-point grand final win over Claremont.

The first of three brothers to play for East Perth, his younger brothers Eddie and George also played for the club.

VFL
Michalczyk was bought by North Melbourne for a reported $30,000 at the start of the 1973 VFL season. He was troubled by injury early in the year, eventually making his debut against Richmond in round 14, but he was on the field for only two minutes before suffering a hamstring injury which ended his season.

He injured his hamstring again during pre-season training in 1974. Michalczyk was sent by the club to the Lewisham Hospital in Sydney for a complete medical check up and he was there for a week receiving treatment. On return to North Melbourne he was able to train without any soreness and, after being cleared by doctors, was selected in the side for round 11. He managed to put together eight successive VFL games that year.

In the 1975 season he appeared in the first three rounds, then was out of the side for two months. He returned in round 12 and played in all of the remaining 11 games of the home and away season. In the qualifying final win over Carlton, Michalczyk played as a half-back for North Melbourne and was one of the side's best with 18 disposals, but had to be replaced at three-quarter time with a knee injury. Initially it was thought he had injured his groin and he was moved into the forward line and it was only after he kicked a goal that he was forced from the ground. The diagnosis was a strained medial ligament, which ruled him out of the rest of the finals series, opening up a spot in the team for Doug Wade. He had to undergo a serious knee operation at the end of the season, followed by another in 1976, and was unable to make it back to VFL football.

Personal life
Michalczyk is an uncle of former West Coast Eagles player Dean Cox. His sister Mary is Dean's mother.

References

External links

1950 births
Living people
Australian rules footballers from Western Australia
North Melbourne Football Club players
East Perth Football Club players